The Bellows Falls Petroglyph Site (designated Site VT-WD-8) is an archaeological site containing panels of precontact Native American petroglyphs in Bellows Falls, Vermont.  Located near the Vilas Bridge on bedrock west of and above the Connecticut River, adjacent to Great Falls, they depict a rarely-seen assemblage of anthropomorphic figures that is believed to be unique in New England, and uncommon even in surrounding geographic areas.  The site was listed on the National Register of Historic Places in 1990.

Description

The petroglyph site is located on the east side of the Bellows Falls Island, south of the Vilas Bridge, which connects Bellows Falls and Walpole, New Hampshire, across the Connecticut River. Each panel contains a series of figures interpreted as human heads, with mouths, eyes, and radiating projections. The abstract features of these heads are consistent with the traditional corn husk masks of the Abenaki and Iroquois peoples, and a similar inscription was discovered in 2015 along the banks of the West River in Brattleboro. Other archaeological sites are located in the general area, but their association to this site is not known. It is known that additional panels may be protected by riprap laid along the river bank; these panels are also sometimes protected from occasional vandalism by silt deposited by the river.

The existence of these figures has been known and commented on since the late 18th century.  Similar figures are rare in New England, but instances of similar figures have been identified in Pennsylvania and Canada from the Great Lakes east.  Because of their rarity, they provide an unusual opportunity to establish prehistoric cultural connections between relatively disparate regions.

See also
National Register of Historic Places listings in Windham County, Vermont

References

External links
 

Archaeological sites on the National Register of Historic Places in Vermont
Bellows Falls, Vermont
Petroglyphs in Vermont
National Register of Historic Places in Windham County, Vermont
Native American history of Vermont